LGBT rights in Georgia may refer to:

 LGBT rights in Georgia (country), about the country in the Caucasus region
 LGBT rights in Georgia (U.S. state), about one of the states that make up the United States of America